El Triste (The sad one) is the title of the second studio album released by Mexican singer José José in 1970.

Like its predecessor, this album projected him to internationalization, due to his performance in the "II Festival de la Canción Latina" ("Latin Song Festival II", predecessor of the OTI Festival) held on March 25, 1970, representing Mexico with the songs "El Triste" by Roberto Cantoral and "Dos" by Welo Rivas, obtaining the third place (according to the jury), in front of an audience that filled the Teatro Ferrocarrilero of Mexico City, who admired his extraordinary performance (claiming he deserved first place). Despite this, "El Triste" was consolidated as an international hit, allowing him to start to tour throughout the United States and Latin America.

Its main hits besides "El Triste" and "Dos" are "Alguien Vendrá", "Mi Niña" and "Esa Canción de Ayer". Its genre is mainly Latin pop with a jazz trend, that can be heard in the arrangements of songs such as "La Noche De Los Dos", "Amoras" or "A Partir De Hoy".

Track listing
 Alguien Vendrá (Sergio Esquivel-Memo Salamanca)
 Mi Niña (Scottie Scott)
 La Noche De Los Dos (Felipe Gil)
 Llegará (Víctor M. Mato)
 Dios Es Amor (Roberto Cantoral)
 El Triste (Roberto Cantoral)
 Esa Canción De Ayer (Jaco Seller-José Luis Fernández)
 Nunca Me Dejes (Blanca Aldás)
 ¡Oh, Gente! (Sergio Esquivel-Memo Salamanca)
 Amoras (Roberto Cantoral)
 A Partir De Hoy (Armando Manzanero)
 Dos (Wello Rivas)

1,6,9 Orchestra by Chucho Ferrer
2,5,7,8,11 Orchestra by Enrique Neri
2,5,10, 12 Orchestra by Eduardo Magallanes
9 Orchestra by Mario Patrón

1970 albums
José José albums
Spanish-language albums
RCA Records albums